Castle Street is a street in the north of central Cambridge, England. To the southeast is a junction with Northampton Street, Magdalene Street, and Chesterton Lane (leading to Chesterton Road). To the northwest is a junction with Mount Pleasant, Huntingdon Road (leading northwest out of Cambridge), Histon Road (leading north out of Cambridge), and Victoria Road.

To the northeast is  St Giles' Church, Castle Hill, the location of Cambridge Castle, and the Cambridgeshire Shire Hall. To the southwest is St Peter's Church and Honey Hill.
On the corner of Castle Street and Northampton Street is the Museum of Cambridge, formerly the Cambridge & County Folk Museum. Also here is Kettle's Yard, a former home and now a modern art gallery and place for reflection.

St Giles' Church, St Peter's Church and Castle Street Methodist Church are beside the street. The Castle Inn public house is also located here.

Gallery

References 

Streets in Cambridge
Museum districts in the United Kingdom
Art gallery districts